The Computer Science Tripos (CST) is the undergraduate course in computer science offered by the University of Cambridge Computer Laboratory. It evolved out of the Diploma in Computer Science, the world's first taught course in computer science, which started in 1953.  Successful candidates are awarded a Bachelor of Arts (BA) honours degree after three years or, a combined BA + Master of Engineering (MEng) honours degree after four years of study, though admission to the fourth year is usually contingent on attaining a first-class result in the third year.

Notable alumni
Aubrey de Grey
Demis Hassabis
Simon Tatham

References

Tripos
Academic courses at the University of Cambridge
Computer science education in the United Kingdom